Bauerngraben is a river of Saxony, Germany. It is a left tributary of the Neue Luppe river, which it joins northwest of Leipzig.

See also
List of rivers of Saxony

Rivers of Saxony
Rivers of Germany